School of the Flower is an album by experimental indie rock band Six Organs of Admittance, released in 2005.

Track listing
"Eighth Cognition/All You've Left" – 5:22
"Words for Two" – 1:40
"Saint Cloud" – 5:36
"Procession of Cherry Blossom Spirits" – 3:30
"Home" – 3:53
"School of the Flower" – 13:31
"Thicker Than a Smokey" – 3:12
"Lisboa" – 2:58

References

2005 albums
Six Organs of Admittance albums
Drag City (record label) albums